Fort Le Duc or Fort LeDuc was a square fort and trading post built near Wetmore, Colorado. It was named after trapper Maurice LeDuc or Maurice LeDoux, and constructed around 1830or 1835.

Geography
The fort was located by the junction of Mineral Creek and Adobe Creek off of the Hardscrabble Trail, an old Native American trail at the foot of Greenhorn Mountain. The trail went through the Wet Mountain Valley and Sangre de Cristo Mountains.

History
Maurice LeDuc was a French Canadian who married a Ute woman. It is believed that he may have obtained money to start the fort and trading post from the Bent brothers, Charles and George Bent. LeDuc had several circumstances that helped him succeed at the site. The Mexican government licensed him to trade, he was able to purchase the moonshine Taos Lightning, and his wife had many Native American friends who traded at the post.

There were wooden gates on the west side of the building that led to a 48-square foot central plaza. An adobe house within the enclosure provided living quarters. The fort, with eight rooms, protected settlers from often hostile Native Americans. It was in service until 1848 or 1854, when settlements such as Hardscarabble were established in the area. There are no remains of the fort today.

A historical marker was installed in 1969 in recognition of Fort Le Duc by the Arkansas Valley Chapter of the Daughters of the American Revolution, Colorado Department of Highways, and Colorado Historical Society. It is located seven miles south of Florence. The historical marker is entitled "Hardscrabble".

Notes

References

Further reading

External links
 Hardscrabble, historical marker

Le Duc
1830 establishments in the United States
Former populated places in Custer County, Colorado
Former populated places in Colorado